The 1953 A Group was the fifth season of the A Football Group, the top Bulgarian professional league for association football clubs, since its establishment in 1948.

Overview
It was contested by 16 teams, and Levski Sofia won the championship.

League standings

Results

Champions
Levski Sofia

Top scorers

References

External links
Bulgaria - List of final tables (RSSSF)
1953 Statistics of A Group at a-pfg.com

First Professional Football League (Bulgaria) seasons
Bulgaria
1
Bulgaria
1